Sarah Howell is a noted cartoonist and educator based in Brunswick, Melbourne. Howell is often involved in projects that promote the Australian comic book art scene. She is a founding member of Squishface Studio, a workspace for artists in which customers looking to buy comics can walk in and watch artists work. She self-publishes zines and mini-comics. Howell was also the first director of the Homecooked Comics Festival. She has worked as a cartooning tutor at Box Hill Community Arts Centre and a cartooning and graphic novels tutor at the Centre for Adult Education in Melbourne.

Career 
Howell was the co-curator and the workshop facilitator of The Dark Woods, a national exhibition and workshop that toured around Australia about the country's comic book art from 2002 to 2006. Howell was the producer of the Gravity Project from 2007 to 2009, a blog documents outdoor and online writing, art, performance and games occurring in Northern Tasmania. From 2009 to 2010, she was the director of the National Young Writers’ Festival in Australia, a festival showcasing the works of "young and innovative writers in both new and traditional forms". In August 2011, Howell was one of eight Melbourne cartoonists to participate in a month residency project at Federation Square called ‘Inherent Vice’, where artists worked to create their pieces and the public could observe them doing so. As a result, in 2012, Howell became a founding member of Squishface Studio, where the same process was applied. Also in 2012, she participated in the Caravan of Comics with nine others—a convoy of comic book artists that toured in America to promote Australian comic art.

Notable partnerships and relationships 
Howell works alongside other artists in Squishface Studio, such as Ben Hutchings, Ele Jenkins, and her husband, David Blumenstein.

References 

Australian comics artists
Australian female comics artists
Living people
Year of birth missing (living people)
Artists from Melbourne
21st-century Australian women artists
People from Brunswick, Victoria